Something Wicked This Way Comes is Cold's third EP and second released in 2000.

Track listing

Personnel
Scooter Ward - vocals, rhythm guitar, piano, keyboards
Kelly Hayes - lead guitar
Jeremy Marshall - bass
Sam McCandless - drums

2000 EPs
Cold (band) EPs